De Todas las Flores ("Of All the Flowers") is the tenth studio album by Mexican singer-songwriter Natalia Lafourcade. It was released on 28 October 2022 on Sony Music Mexico. It draws inspiration from a variety of Latin jazz and folk genres, including bolero, cumbia, bossa nova, samba, and son jarocho.

Background 

De Todas las Flores was Lafourcade's first album of completely original material in seven years, since 2015's Hasta la Raíz. The album was produced by French-Mexican musician Adán Jodorowsky, once a neighbor of Lafourcade in Mexico City, who also enlisted American guitarist Marc Ribot, American bassist Sebastian Steinberg, and French percussionist Cyril Atef to play on the album. Pianist and arranger Emilio Dorantes also performs on the album.

Lafourcade described the album as her "musical diary," exploring themes of heartbreak, loss, and grief. She drew inspiration from nature, especially her home garden in Xalapa, Veracruz. The album's title "references the inner flowers that have withered and the ones still blooming." Lafourcade's influences for the album include Violeta Parra, Omara Portuondo, and Joni Mitchell.

The album was recorded entirely on analog tape in a Texas town near El Paso.

Critical reception 

De Todas las Flores was met with critical acclaim, with several publications listing it among the best albums of 2022. AllMusic's Thom Jurek praised the album's "exquisite taste, emotion, and adventure," describing Lafourcade's singing as "warm, immediate, intimate, and commanding." Music critic Anthony Fantano named it the best album of the year.

Year-end lists

Track listing

Charts

References

External links 
 

2022 albums
Sony Music Mexico albums
Natalia Lafourcade albums